CSR may refer to:

Biology
 Central serous retinopathy, a visual impairment
 Cheyne–Stokes respiration, an abnormal respiration pattern
 Child sex ratio, ratio between female and male births
 Class switch recombination, a process that changes the constant region of an immunoglobulin
 Clinical study report, on a clinical trial
 Combat stress reaction, a condition also known as shell shock or battle fatigue
 C-S-R Triangle theory, an application of the universal adaptive strategy theory to plant biology in which strategies are competitor, stress tolerator, and ruderal

Computers
 Certificate signing request, in computer security
 Command success rate, a measure of performance in computer speech recognition programs
 Compressed sparse row, a storage format for a sparse matrix
 Control/Status Register, a register in central processing units

Government
 Chinese Soviet Republic, a short-lived state in 20th century China
 Common Sense Revolution, a political movement in Ontario, Canada
 Community service register, a type of police report in India
 Comprehensive School Reform, a program administered by the U.S. Department of Education
 Comprehensive Spending Review, a governmental process in the United Kingdom carried out by HM Treasury
 Cost sharing reductions subsidy, until its elimination in 2017, a primary component of high-deductible health plans under the U.S. Patient Protection and Affordable Care Act (often referred to as Obamacare)
 Czechoslovak Republic, several historical states in Europe

Organizations
 Center for Scientific Review, a center at the National Institutes of Health, US Department of Health and Human Services
 Centre for Software Reliability, UK
 Center for Strategic Research (Iran), a research governmental institute in Iran
 Comités syndicalistes révolutionnaires, a former a trade-unionist organization
 CSR plc, formerly Cambridge Silicon Radio, a British silicon chip designer and software company
 CSR Corporation Limited, a former Chinese manufacturer of locomotive and rolling stock
 CSR Group, a Chinese railway equipment manufacturer
 CSR Limited, an Australian industrial company, formerly known as Colonial Sugar Refining Company
 Cutch State Railway, a former Indian railway company

Psychology
 Cognitive science of religion, the study of religious thought and behavior from the perspective of the cognitive and evolutionary sciences
 Cultic Studies Review, a journal on cults, psychology, and religion

Other

 CSR 97.4FM, a radio station in Canterbury, UK
 CSR Racing, a 2012 drag racing game for mobile platforms
 CSR (group), a South Korean girl group
 Team 18, an Australian V8 Supercar team
 C Sports Racer, a class of racing cars
 Cab Secure Radio, a radio telephone system used on UK railways
 C. S. R. Anjaneyulu (1907–1963), an Indian actor
 Canning Stock Route, the longest historic livestock route in the world
 Corn Suitability Rating, a measure of soil quality commonly used in the state of Iowa, US
 Certified shorthand reporter, a court reporter
 Customer service representative, a job title in the service industry
 Cherokee Scout Reservation, a Boy Scout camp in Caswell County, North Carolina
 Cedarlands Scout Reservation, a Boy Scout camp in Long Lake, New York
 Competition Success Review, a youth magazine published in India
 Corporate social responsibility, a concept whereby businesses take responsibility for the impact of their activities
 Complete spatial randomness
 Czechoslovak Socialist Republic, which broke up in 1990